The 1956 Guild of Television Producers and Directors Awards were the second annual giving of the awards which later became known as the British Academy Television Awards.

Winners
Actor
Peter Cushing
Actress
Virginia McKenna
Designer
Bruce Angrave
Personality
Glyn Daniel
Production
Gil Calder
Script writer
Colin Morris
Writers Award
Colin Morris

References

Sources
Archive of winners on official BAFTA website (retrieved February 19, 2006).

1956
Guild of Television Producers and Directors Awards
Guild of Television Producers and Directors Awards
Guild of Television Producers and Directors Awards